A chain gun is a type of autocannon or machine gun that uses an external source of power to cycle the weapon's action. Rather than diverting excess energy from the cartridges' propellant as in a typical automatic firearm, it is powered by a continuous loop of chain similar to that used on a motorcycle or bicycle.

History 

In 1972, Hughes Helicopters began a company-funded research effort to design a single machine gun to fire the U.S. Army's M50  round. By April 1973, the program had fired test rounds in more powerful  WECOM linked ammunition, from a prototype (A model). In January 1975 a model "C" was added, a linkless version for the proposed Advanced Attack Helicopter YAH-64; the helicopter was later adopted as the Hughes Model 77/AH-64A Apache, with the model C (receiving the designation M230 chain gun) as standard armament. In 1976, Hughes Helicopters patented the chain gun, and it has since been further developed into several other systems of different calibers.

, "chain gun" is a registered trademark of Northrop Grumman Innovation Systems (formerly Orbital ATK, following several mergers and acquisitions after Hughes Helicopters) for "externally-powered machine guns".

Design 

There are several differences between chain guns and other types of autocannon. While rotary guns can also use an external source of power to cycle the weapon's mechanism, they have multiple rotating barrels (unlike chain guns) and the necessary actions are performed by complex rotating cam mechanisms, not a chain. Recoil-operated guns (e.g. many machine guns, the Bofors gun) and gas-operated guns (e.g. most assault rifles, the ShVAK cannon) depend upon the firing of the cartridges of the weapon's ammunition to power the cycle of action, instead of external power source. As a cartridge may misfire - completely fail to fire, hang fire - or discharge with insufficient force to cycle the mechanism, this fundamental dependence affects the reliability of such weapons.

In contrast, in a chain gun the action of the firearm is cycled by a chain driven by an electric motor. The chain moves in a rectangular circuit around four sprockets that apply tension to it. One link of the chain is connected to the bolt assembly, moving it back and forth to load, fire, extract, and eject cartridges. Each full cycle consists of four different periods of the key link travelling along the circuit. Two periods (passage along the "long" sides of the rectangle) control the movement of the bolt: the time that the bolt takes to drive forward and load a round into the chamber, and how quickly the bolt retracts and extracts the spent cartridge after firing. The other two periods, when the chain moves across the "short" sides of the rectangle, sideways relative to the axis of the barrel, determine how long the breech remains locked while firing, and open to allow cartridge extraction and ventilation of fumes.

A misfired round does not stop the functioning of the weapon, as it might with guns that use energy from a fired cartridge to load the next round; it is simply ejected. Thus, the chain gun operating principle is inherently reliable. An unclassified report on the EX-34 prepared by the Naval Surface Weapons Center in Dahlgren, Virginia, dated September 23, 1983, said that:29,721 rounds of endurance tests were fired with no parts breakage and without any gun stoppages ... It is significant that during firing of 101,343 rounds not one jam or stoppage occurred due to loss of round control in the gun or feeder mechanism ... [this] is in our experience very unusual in any weapon of any caliber or type.

The time that the chain takes to move around a complete loop of the rectangle controls the rate of fire. Accordingly, varying the motor-speed allows a chain gun, in principle, to fire at a continuously variable rate from single rounds to the maximum safe rate. The maximum rate depends on the pressure drop rates in the barrel after firing a cartridge, on mechanical tolerances, and other factors. For example, the 7.62mm NATO version EX-34 was advertised to offer 570 rounds per minute, and developmental work was underway for a 1,000-rounds-per-minute version. In practice, chain guns usually have two or three set firing speeds.

Examples

See also 

 Polybolos

References

Bibliography 

 
 
 U.S. Army Field Manual 3-22.1

External links 

 Northrop Grumman - Bushmaster Chain Guns and Automatic Cannons
 U. S. Army TACOM-RI

Machine guns
Autocannon